Veterinary dentistry is the field of dentistry applied to the care of animals. It is the art and science of prevention, diagnosis, and treatment of conditions, diseases, and disorders of the oral cavity, the maxillofacial region, and its associated structures as it relates to animals.

In the United States, veterinary dentistry is one of 20 veterinary specialties recognized by the American Veterinary Medical Association (AVMA). Veterinary dentists offer services in the fields of endodontics, oral and maxillofacial radiology and surgery, oral medicine, orthodontics, pedodontics, periodontics, and prosthodontics. Similar to human dentists, they treat conditions such as jaw fractures, malocclusions, oral cancer, periodontal disease, stomatitis, and other conditions unique to veterinary medicine (e.g. feline odontoclastic resorptive lesions).

Some animals have specialized dental workers, such as equine dental technicians, who conduct routine work on horses.

Overview
The practice of veterinary dentistry and oral medicine and surgery is performed by veterinarians in accordance with their state veterinary practice acts. Veterinary health-care workers may be allowed to perform certain non-invasive, non-surgical oral and dental procedures under the direct supervision of a licensed veterinarian in accordance with state regulations. As with other areas of veterinary practice, veterinary dentistry requires a veterinarian-client-patient relationship to protect the health, safety, and welfare of animals.

One of the most vital areas of veterinary dentistry is that it addresses periodontal disease, the most common dental condition in dogs and cats. Pets as young as three years old can show early evidence of periodontal disease, which will worsen if effective preventive measures are not taken. Early detection and treatment are critical, because advanced periodontal disease can cause severe problems and pain.

Pain originating from dental problems is very rarely recognized by owners or professionals. Seldom will an animal become anorexic due to a dental problem. The exception to this is in the case of severe soft tissue injury, for example chronic gingivostomatitis. In general, dental pain is a chronic pain, and it is only after treatment that an owner reports how much better their pet is doing. Pain is often mistaken for a pet just getting old. Very few clients examine their pets’ teeth unless they are carrying out daily home care, so actual dental problems often go unnoticed.

Recognizing symptoms that may have a link to dental diseases, such as a nasal discharge or external facial swellings, is often a priority. In some cases, dental patients may present with what appear to be neurological symptoms.

In horses, continuous grazing leads to dental attrition. Also, due to the continuous development of a horse’s hypsodont teeth, there will be dental crown wear which can create jagged and sharp edges and attribute to uneven wear. Dental care for horses is designed to prevent "quidding,” or dropping food out of the mouth while eating, ulcerations on the cheek or tongue, resistance or unusual sensitivity to the bit, root abscessation, development of mandibular fistulas from infections in the lower cheek teeth, and difficulty flexing at the poll.

Oral disease

Periodontal disease 

The most common and significant oral disease is the inflammation of the deeper supporting structures of the tooth and surrounding tissues of the periodontium; it is also called periodontal disease or periodontitis. It begins with the formation of plaque, specifically subgingival plaque within the gingival sulcus or periodontal pocket. This allows a proliferation of bacteria; the subsequent inflammation and the animal's own immune response starts the progression of periodontal disease. The hallmark feature of periodontitis is attachment loss of the tooth from the alveolar bone. Periodontitis is an irreversible process unless the animal is treated with advanced periodontal surgery techniques.

Consequences of periodontal disease 
Periodontal disease eventually culminates in tooth loss; however, significant health problems can precede this. Local consequences include the development of an oronasal fistula or periodontal-endodontic lesion, infections or abscesses in the eye, a fractured jaw, osteomyelitis, and oral cancer.

Systemic consequences affect multiple organs. For example, bacteremia from periodontal disease can cause inflammation of the hepatic tissue, portal vein fibrosis, and cholestasis. Chronic stimulation of the immune system can lead to immune complexes in the kidney, causing glomerulonephritis, chronic kidney inflammation and secondary scarring, decreased kidney function and ability to filtrate, and chronic kidney disease. Bacteremia also affects the heart, because circulating bacteria attach to the heart valves, putting the heart at increased risk of endocarditis, hypertension, and roughening of the epithelium of the heart tissue. There may be metabolic changes such as insulin resistance due to the increased inflammatory proteins.

Gingivitis 

Gingivitis is the earliest stage of periodontal disease. It is the inflammation of the gingiva and is caused by bacterial plaque, but it is reversible and preventable.

Gingivitis appears as a thin red line along the margin of the gums and may be accompanied by swollen gum margins, bad breath, plaque and tartar. The earliest clinical sign of gingivitis is bleeding on probing, chewing, or brushing.

Signs and symptoms of oral disease 
The most common signs of oral disease include:
Halitosis
Broken or discoloured teeth
Changes in eating behaviour
Rubbing or pawing at the face
Ptyalism
Bleeding from the mouth
Inability or unwillingness to open or close the mouth
Change in temperament
Morbidity
Weight loss

Diagnosis 
Most pet owners are not aware that their pet has an oral problem, so an examination of the oral cavity should form part of every physical examination given by the veterinarian. The current Canine Preventive Healthcare Guidelines and Feline Preventive Healthcare Guidelines from the American Animal Hospital Association (AAHA) and AVMA both include dental care as part of the assessment during annual veterinary examinations. Oral examination in a conscious animal can only give limited information and a definitive oral examination can only be performed under general anesthesia. Examinations are supposed to occur at least once a year to identify any problems and ensure optimal oral health.

Examining the whole animal, even when the primary complaint is the mouth, is routine. Some dental diseases may be the result of a systemic problem and some may result in systemic complications, including kidney, liver, and heart muscle changes. In all cases, dental procedures require a general anesthetic, so it is important to establish the cardiovascular and respiratory status and the physiological values of the patient to avoid risks or complications.

Radiography 
Radiographs (x-rays) may be needed to evaluate the health of the jaw and the tooth roots below the gum line. Most dental disease occurs below the gum line and is not visible. Some of the indications for dental radiography include:

 Assessment of bone levels and type of bone loss caused by periodontal disease.
 Assessment of endodontic disease including apical pathology, pulp exposures, and draining fistulae.
 Pathology of the oral soft and hard tissues, including tumors and fractures.
 Evaluation of temporomandibular joint dysfunction.
 Crown/root pathology including tooth resorptive lesions, crown or root fractures, extra roots, or dilacerated roots.
 Comparison of pre/post tooth extraction sites.
 Root canal therapy.
 Oligodontia (absence of most teeth) or extra teeth.
 Assessment of tooth development and chronological dental age of the animal.

Oral abnormalities, anomalies, and defects 
Abnormal, anomalous, or defective pet teeth are sometimes encountered in veterinary practice. One or several teeth may be involved and the concern may be for esthetics, function, patient comfort, or a combination of these issues. Causes may be congenital, developmental, or due to lifestyle factors.

Malocclusions 
Malocclusion is the imperfect positioning of the teeth when the jaw is closed. In dogs and cats with normal occlusion, the upper incisors rest in front of the lower incisors, the lower canines fit in the diastema between the upper canine and third incisor, the upper first premolars fit behind the lower first premolars, and the upper fourth premolars overlap the lower first molars. Any deviations are known as malocclusions, and they are separated by class.

Class I malocclusion (MAL/1) 
Also known as neutrocclusion, MAL/1 occurs when the maxilla and mandible are correctly proportioned, but one or more teeth are misaligned. This type of malocclusion is further classified by type:

 Rostral cross bite (RXB) – one or more of the upper incisors are displaced so they rest behind the lower incisors, rather than in front. May be caused by retained deciduous (baby) upper incisors, preventing normal eruption of adult incisors.
 Caudal cross bite (CXB) – the mandible is wider than the maxilla in the area of the premolars. Instead of the upper fourth premolar resting against the inner cheek (buccal occlusion) and the lower first molar resting against the tongue (lingual occlusion), the positional relationship is reversed. This is commonly observed in dolichocephalic head types (having a long skull).
 Linguoversion (LV) – the lower canines are in the correct anatomic position but are angled inward towards the tongue, which can cause trauma to the palatal tissue (the roof of the mouth).
 Mesioversion (MV) – occurs when a tooth is in the correct anatomic position in the dental arch but is angled more forward than normal.
 Labioversion (LABV) – occurs when an incisor or canine tooth is in the correct anatomic position in the dental arch but is angled towards the lips.
 Distoversion (DV) – occurs when a tooth is in the correct anatomic position in the dental arch but is angled more behind than normal.
 Buccoversion (BV) – occurs when a tooth is in the correct anatomic position in the dental arch but is angled outward towards the cheeks.

Class II malocclusion (MAL/2) 
Also called distoclusion, brachygnathism, overshot jaw, overbite, and parrot mouth, MAL/2 occurs when the upper teeth rest in front of the lower equivalents. The maxilla is forward (maxillary prognathism) and the mandible is behind (mandibular retrognathism). It is more common in animals with dolichocephalic skulls, such as Collies. It is the most common oral birth defect in horses.

Class III malocclusion (MAL/3) 

Also called mesioclusion, prognathism, undershot jaw, and underbite, MAL/3 occurs when the upper teeth rest behind the lower equivalents. The maxilla is behind (maxillary retrognathism) and the mandible is forward (mandibular prognathism). It is more common in animals with brachycephalic skulls, such as pugs. This type of malocclusion is also often associated with rostral cross bite.

Other malocclusions 

 Level bite – end-to-end bite of the incisors. Genetically is a degree of prognathism.
 Wry mouth – refers to a variety of unilateral occlusal abnormalities. Genetically only affects one quadrant of the mandible or maxilla, such as one segment of the jaw being disproportionately sized relative to the other half.
 Oligodontia – only a few teeth are present
 Anodontia – congenital absence of teeth
 Hypodontia – one or a few teeth are missing
 Polydontia – presence of more teeth than is normal (supernumerary teeth)
 Retained deciduous (baby) teeth – occurs when erupting permanent teeth do not push deciduous teeth out. This is common in toy breed dogs.

Oral lesions and masses 
Some animals will develop oral lesions, masses, or growths, which may be benign or malignant. These may be caused by tooth or gum infections, tumors, or genetic predisposition. Most pets do not show signs of oral masses until it has grown large enough to make chewing and swallowing difficult. Bad breath, excessive drooling, or bloody oral discharge may also be signs of an oral lesion or mass.

Malignant tumors 

Melanoma – cancerous tumor that spreads to regional lymph nodes and lungs. Bone destruction is usually evident around the tumor. Most commonly observed in dogs; it is rare in cats.
Squamous cell carcinoma – fast-growing tumor that is often ulcerated. It spreads slowly and invades bone tissue. It is the most common oral tumor in cats and second most common tumor in dogs.
Fibrosarcoma – occurs at a younger age than other oral malignancies. It metastasizes slowly but is aggressively invasive. It is the second most common tumor in cats and third most common in dogs.
Osteosarcoma – may affect the bones of the maxilla or mandible. Oral osteosarcoma is more responsive to surgical intervention than the appendicular version.

Nonmalignant tumors 

Epulis – general term for any gingival mass. A biopsy and radiograph is required in order to differentiate the type.
 Peripheral odontogenic fibroma – grows from the periodontal ligament. It contains no invasion of bone tissue and has a firm, smooth surface. It may cause tooth displacement. It is the most common benign tumor in dogs.
 Peripheral acanthomatous ameloblastoma – a slow-growing tumor that has a raised, cauliflower appearance and may transform into a malignant tumor at a later stage. It is usually invaded by surrounding bone tissue and aggressive surgical removal is required.

Resorptive lesions 

Also known as feline cervical neck lesions or feline odontoclastic resorptive lesions, resorptive lesions are most commonly observed in the cat but have been identified in other species as well. The lesion usually starts at the cementoenamel junction and furcation area between the roots of a tooth. They appear as an overgrowth of gingival or pulpal tissue. The lesions erode the dentin within a single tooth (or several simultaneously). It spreads rapidly once it reaches the pulp of the tooth. The crown of the tooth may appear normal, but the tooth may have little to no root left. This is a very painful condition.

Teeth with resorptive lesions are incurable and cannot be prevented. There is no concrete evidence for the cause, but some studies have suggested they are caused by an excess of vitamin D. Extraction is the only method of treatment.

Developmental conditions 

 Gemination – two crowns share one single root canal in an attempt to form two separate teeth from one enamel origin.
 Fusion – two tooth buds grow together to form one larger tooth.
 Impaction – the inability of the tooth to erupt through the gum. This can cause the development of a fluid-filled cyst surrounding the tooth and destruction to alveolar bone.
 Misdirected teeth – teeth that erupt in an abnormal direction.
Enamel dysplasia – insufficient hardness or amount of enamel due to not properly forming. The enamel is soft, flakes off, stains easily, has a rough or pitted surface, and exposes underlying dentin once chipped away.

Dental cleaning
In dogs, as in humans, daily tooth brushing is considered the gold standard for at-home prophylaxis and prevention of gingivitis and periodontal disease progression. A Swedish study with over 60,000 respondents reported that only 4% of dog owners brushed their dog's teeth daily.

Basic dental cleaning under general anesthesia includes scaling to remove dental plaque, tartar, and calculus deposits, as well as polishing to smooth out microabrasions caused by the dental equipment and normal wear and tear. Endodontic procedures such as tooth extractions and root canals are also performed.

The horse will be sedated or given analgesics for dental cleaning. Dental prophylaxis is often called “floating,” and handheld rasps or power instruments are used to grind, balance, and realign the occlusal surfaces of the incisors and cheek teeth. Motorized dental instruments should be used carefully to avoid thermal and pressure trauma to the teeth. This means using low-speed grinders without leaving them in one spot for long periods of time, using light pressure, and using water irrigation to rinse and prevent overheating caused by the friction of the instruments.

Dental instruments 
Dental instruments are tools used to provide dental treatment. They include tools to examine, manipulate, treat, restore, and remove teeth and surrounding oral structures.

Hand instruments 

 Curette – used for removing calculus above and below the gumline. It is also used for root planing. It has a U-shaped cross-section and the tip is rounded with up to two sharp edges. The two most commonly used types are the Gracey curette and the Universal curette.
 Sickle scaler – used for removing calculus above the gumline, as well as removing calculus from pits, fissures, developmental grooves, and areas between each tooth. The blade can be straight or curved with a sharp tip and two cutting edges on either side.
 Explorer – used to examine the surface of the tooth to detect any abnormalities, such as resorptive lesions, caries, or fractured teeth. It is also used to assess tooth mobility. The most common type is the Shepherd's hook.
 Periodontal probe – used to measure gingival recession, which ascertains the stage of any periodontal disease. It has a blunted tip that is marked in 1 mm increments. The probe is inserted into the gingival sulcus to measure its depth. Normal sulcus depth in the dog is < 3 mm and < 1 mm in cats. 
 Elevator – used to stretch, cut, and tear the periodontal ligament in order to displace the tooth root from the socket. The tip has a rounded scoop appearance with a sharp edge, which may or may not be serrated.
 Luxator – used to cut the periodontal ligament around the tooth; it is not used for leverage. It is similar to a dental elevator in design but has a thinner tip to allow easier access to the periodontal ligament.
Extraction forceps – used for gripping and removing the tooth after it has been loosened. It can also be used for cracking and dislodging heavy dental calculus.

Power instruments 

 Ultrasonic scaler – used for removing calculus above the gumline. It utilizes a removable tip that vibrates at high frequencies by converting sound waves into mechanical vibrations, allowing for more rapid removal of calculus. It generates a substantial amount of heat and may cause thermal damage to the pulp if left on the surface of the tooth for too long.
 Sonic scaler – used for removing calculus above the gumline. It utilizes compressed air and operates at lower frequencies than an ultrasonic scaler. It is also less likely to cause thermal damage.
Low-speed handpiece – utilizes a rubber tip called a prophy angle that polishes microabrasions and small grooves on the surface of the tooth.
High-speed handpiece – utilizes a variety of removable dental burs to section teeth and remove alveolar bone during extractions.

Dental charting 
All findings from an oral examination should be recorded on a dental chart. These include missing, rotated, and fractured teeth, probing depths of gingival recession, enamel hyperplasia or other enamel defects, mobility, furcation involvement, and other oral pathology. Charting not only records the current state of the dentition and soft tissues of the oral cavity, allowing the formulation of a treatment plan, but also provides a permanent record for future comparisons.

The severity of gingivitis is scored by using the Gingival Index (GI), which consists of four stages:
 Stage 0 (GI0) – characterized by normal gingiva.
 Stage 1 (GI1) – marginal gingivitis with mild swelling of the gum tissue, some color change, and no bleeding upon probing.
 Stage 2 (GI2) – moderate swelling and inflammation of the gum tissue, and bleeding upon probing.
 Stage 3 (GI3) – severe gingivitis with marked swelling and inflammation, as well as spontaneous bleeding.

The severity of periodontal disease is scored by using the Periodontal Disease Index (PD), which consists of five stages:
 Stage 0 (PD0) – characterized by the absence of disease.
Stage 1 (PD1) – characterized by presence of gingivitis. This stage can be treated with dental scaling, polishing, irrigation, and home health care.
 Stage 2 (PD2) – early periodontal disease with less than 25% attachment loss of the tooth from the alveolar bone. The treatment for this stage includes the addition of locally applied antimicrobials and subgingival scaling.
 Stage 3 (PD3) – established periodontal disease with 25–50% attachment loss of the tooth from the alveolar bone. Treatment includes teeth extraction, closed or open root planing, or advanced periodontal treatment options like guided tissue regeneration.
 Stage 4 (PD4) – advanced periodontal disease with more than 50% attachment loss of the tooth from the alveolar bone. Extraction of teeth or periodontal surgery, including osseous resective or additive procedures, are necessary. The prognosis for this stage is guarded.

The amount of calculus present is scored by using the Calculus Index (CI), which consists of four stages:

 Stage 0 (CI0) – no calculus is present.
 Stage 1 (CI1) – some calculus above the gum line that covers less than 1/3 of the tooth surface.
 Stage 2 (CI2) – moderate calculus covering 1/3 to 2/3 of the tooth surface with minimal calculus below the gum line.
 Stage 3 (CI3) – heavy calculus covering more than 2/3 of the tooth surface and extending below the gum line.

See also
Equine dentistry
Horse teeth
Dental health diets for dogs
Dental health diets for cats

References

External links
Organizations:
Academy of Veterinary Dental Technicians
Academy of Veterinary Dentistry
American Society of Veterinary Dental Technicians
American Veterinary Dental College
American Veterinary Dental Society
British Veterinary Dental Association
European Veterinary Dental College
European Veterinary Dental Society
Veterinary Oral Health Council
WikiVet Dentistry
Guidelines:
AAHA-AVMA canine preventive healthcare guidelines 
AAHA-AVMA feline preventive healthcare guidelines 

 
Veterinary professions